Mohamad Yehya Al Rashed (born February 1, 1982, in Aleppo, Syria) is a Syrian football player who is currently playing for  Hutteen in the Syrian Premier League and he is a former member of the Syria national football team.

Al-Rashed played for Al-Ittihad in the 2006 AFC Champions League group stage.

References

External links
 
 Career stats at Kooora.com (Arabic)
 Career stats at ittihadaleppo.com (Arabic)

1982 births
Living people
Sportspeople from Aleppo
Syrian footballers
Syrian expatriate footballers
Syria international footballers
Al-Ittihad Aleppo players
Tishreen SC players
Association football midfielders
Expatriate footballers in Egypt
Expatriate footballers in Iraq
Syrian expatriate sportspeople in Egypt
Syrian expatriate sportspeople in Iraq
Syrian Premier League players